Maddie Breeze is a British sociologist, and lecturer and Chancellor's Fellow at the University of Strathclyde. In 2016 she won the Philip Abrams Memorial Prize of the British Sociological Association for her book Seriousness in Women’s Roller Derby: Gender, Organization, and Ambivalence.

The book is an ethnographic study of a women's roller derby league in Edinburgh, UK. The book is a published version of her PhD thesis, which she completed at the University of Edinburgh in 2014. It examines "seriousness" in roller derby, and how gender influences the way the sport is represented, played and experienced.

Breeze previously worked as a Research Associate in Sociology and a lecturer in Public sociology at Queen Margaret University in Edinburgh, UK.

Awards and honours
 2016, Philip Abrams Memorial Prize of the British Sociological Association

Selected publications

References 

British women sociologists
British sociologists
Alumni of the University of Edinburgh
Academics of the University of Strathclyde
Living people
Year of birth missing (living people)
Academics of Queen Margaret University
British women non-fiction writers